José Álvaro Morais was a Portuguese film director. His film O Bobo won the Golden Leopard at the 1987 Locarno International Film Festival.

Filmography
Cantigamente Nº 3 (1975)
Ma Femme Chamada Bicho (1976)
O Bobo (1987)
Zéfiro (1993)
Peixe Lua (2000)
Quaresma (2003)

References

External links

People from Coimbra
Portuguese film directors
1943 births
2004 deaths
Portuguese people of Brazilian descent
People from Lisbon